Tara is an Indian soap opera that aired on Zee TV channel, based on the trials and tribulations, the joys and sorrows of the main character, Tara. The series was known as the  first ever Indian soap on contemporary urban women, and was the first Hindi-language drama series to run for about five years. Besides focusing on the life of Tara, the series also showed the lives of her four other friends, Kanchan, Devyani, Arzoo and Sheena.

Cast

References

External links

1993 Indian television series debuts
1997 Indian television series endings
Indian television soap operas
Zee TV original programming
Indian LGBT-related television shows